Filippians may refer to one of the following:
Filippians, a sect of Old Believers
Philippians, i.e., the Epistle to the Philippians

See also
Republic of the Philippines in the Western Pacific, and its Filipino people.